Skin tracks are a cutaneous condition that result secondary to intravenous drug abuse.

See also 
 Skin pop scar
 List of cutaneous conditions

References 

Skin conditions resulting from physical factors